Nia Sharma (born 17 September 1990) is an Indian actress and model who appears in Hindi television. She is known for her roles as Manvi Chaudhary in Ek Hazaaron Mein Meri Behna Hai, Zee TV's Jamai Raja as Roshni Patel, Colors TV's Ishq Mein Marjawan as Aarohi Kashyap and Naagin 4 as Brinda Parekh. In 2017, she participated in Khatron Ke Khiladi 8 and finished as a finalist.

In 2020, she participated in Khatron Ke Khiladi – Made in India and emerged as the winner. Sharma entered the digital world in 2017 with Vikram Bhatt's web series Twisted. In 2021, she was seen in the second season of her web series Jamai 2.0, which released digitally on ZEE5. In 2022, Sharma was seen as a contestant in Colors TV's dance reality show Jhalak Dikhhla Jaa 10.

Early life

Sharma was born on 17 September 1990.

Career

2010–2013: Debut and breakthrough

Sharma started her acting career into television in 2010 with Star Plus's Kaali - Ek Agnipariksha, appearing as Anu. She then played Nisha Mehta in the channel's multi starrer Behenein.

Sharma got her first break when she signed the parallel main lead role of Manvi Chaudhary alongside Krystle D'Souza, Karan Tacker and Kushal Tandon in Star Plus's Ek Hazaaron Mein Meri Behna Hai which had a successful run of 2 years, from 2011 to 2013.

2014–2020: Establishment and awards success

Sharma then signed Zee TV's Jamai Raja portraying the role of Roshni Patel opposite Ravi Dubey, produced by Bollywood superstar Akshay Kumar, which she was a part of from 2014 until she quit the show in 2016. In 2017, she marked her debut on digital platform with Vikram Bhatt's web series Twisted, an erotic thriller where she co-starred with Rrahul Sudhir and Namit Khanna as Aliyah Mukherjee, a supermodel.

In July 2017, Sharma participated in eighth season of Colors TV's popular stunt-based reality show Fear Factor: Khatron Ke Khiladi hosted by Rohit Shetty. She was eliminated from the show two times, before re-entering again, and survived until the show ended, emerging as the first finalist. From October 2017 to January 2018, she was seen in Star Plus show Meri Durga as Palasha Trivedi.

Sharma next reprised her character in the second and third season of Twisted In July 2018 she found her next character in Colors TV's suspense thriller series Ishq Mein Marjawan, in which she had the double role of Aarohi Kashyap and Anjali Sharma opposite Arjun Bijlani until the show ended in June 2019, which had a successful run of 2 years. Later she reunited with Dubey in the web series Jamai 2.0 on ZEE5.

In November 2019, she joined Naagin 4: Bhagya Ka Zehreela Khel, the fourth season of Colors TV's supernatural revenge franchise Naagin produced by Ekta Kapoor, in which she starred as shape shifting serpent Brinda opposite Vijayendra Kumeria until it went off air in August 2020. Just after its culmination, she participated in Fear Factor: Khatron Ke Khiladi – Made in India and became winner.

2021–present: OTT projects and Jhalak Dikhhla Jaa 10

The second season of ZEE5's Jamai 2.0 was launched in 2021, where Sharma and Dubey united for the fourth time. In September 2021, she was a guest for just one day in the OTT version of popular game reality show Bigg Boss.

In 2022, she participated in Colors TV's dance-based reality show Jhalak Dikhhla Jaa 10 by pairing up with choreographer Tarun Raj Nihalani, and finished at 8th place.

In the media

Sharma's acting performances in Ek Hazaaron Mein Meri Behna Hai, Jamai Raja, Ishq Mein Marjawan  and Naagin: Bhagya Ka Zehreela Khel established her as a leading actress of Indian television industry.

Sharma was ranked No. 3 in 2016 and No. 2 in 2017 in the Top 50 Sexiest Asian Women List by British-based Eastern Eye newspaper.

In 2020, Sharma was ranked at No. 2 in The Times Most Desirable Women on TV 2020.

Filmography

Television

Special appearances

Web series

Music videos

Awards

Won 
2012 – Indian Television Academy Awards, Desh Ki Dhadkan – Best Actress – Popular for Ek Hazaaron Mein Meri Behna Hai
2015 – Indian Television Academy Awards, Gr8! Face Female for Jamai Raja

Nominated
2013 – Indian Telly Awards, Best Actress in a Lead Role – Ek Hazaaron Mein Meri Behna Hai
2014 – Indian Television Academy Awards, Best Onscreen Couple – Jamai Raja
2015 – Indian Telly Awards, Best Onscreen Couple for Jamai Raja
2015 – Zee Gold Awards, Best Actor (Female) for Jamai Raja
2015 – Zee Gold Awards, Most Popular Jodi for Jamai Raja
2019 – Indian Telly Awards, Best Actress in a Lead Role for Ishq Mein Marjawan

See also
List of Indian television actresses

References

External links

 
 

1990 births
Living people
Indian television actresses
Indian soap opera actresses
21st-century Indian actresses
Fear Factor: Khatron Ke Khiladi participants
Bigg Boss (Hindi TV series) contestants